Mason City Community School District (also known as Mason City Schools) is a public school district headquartered in Mason City, Iowa. It is entirely in Cerro Gordo County and serves the city and surrounding rural areas.

History

In December 2018, the Iowa State Auditors office found improper distribution of funds, during an eight-year period, concerning $2.2 million. Superintendent Anita Micich did not get the permission from the school board to approve the payments. The office of the Cerro Gordo County Attorney chose not to file criminal charges.

Athletics
The school district applied to join the Northeast Iowa Conference but all of the existing conference members voted to not allow the district to join.

Schools
 High schools
 Mason City High School
 Alternative High School

 Middle schools
 John Adams Middle School

 Intermediate schools
 Lincoln Intermediate School

 Elementary schools
 Harding Elementary School
 Hoover Elementary School
 Jefferson Elementary School
 Roosevelt Elementary School

Other:
 Pinecrest Center

See also
List of school districts in Iowa

References

External links
 Mason City Community School District
School districts in Iowa
Mason City, Iowa
Education in Cerro Gordo County, Iowa
School districts established in 1890
1890 establishments in Iowa